Jawahar Navodaya Vidyalaya, Minicoy or JNV Lakshadweep is a boarding, co-educational school in Lakshadweep U.T. in India. JNV Minicoy is funded by M.H.R.D. and administered by Navodaya Vidyalaya Smiti, an autonomous body under the ministry. Navodaya Vidyalayas offer free education to talented children from Class VI to XII.

History 
The school was established in 1988, and is a part of Jawahar Navodaya Vidyalaya schools. This school is administered and monitored by Hyderabad regional office of Navodaya Vidyalaya Smiti.

Navodaya Vidyalaya Minicoy in 90s had an exchange program with JNV Sitapur, whereby first 2 batches of JNV Sitapur exchanged 30% of their students with each other at class 9th level. The first batch of 11 students from JNV sitapur came to Mincoy in 1991 of which 6 eventually passed their class Xth from JNV minicoy. (included Anurag Verma ( https://www.linkedin.com/in/anuragxl ), Anoop Kamle, Rakesh Rastogi, Sachin Sonkar, Awadhesh Singh, Arun Kumar, Anuj Kumar, Rajesh Kumar, Payoj Singh, Imamuddin, Ayub Ali) 

Mr. Joseph Mundiyankal was the principal of the school from 1990 to 1992, After him Mr. Epen Luke took over this role in 1992. The initial Teaching Staff included
1. Ms Usha Rani (History)
2. Mr Ganeshan (Mathematics)
3. Mr. Sivadasan (Hindi)
4. Mr. Trivedi (Hindi)

Admission 
Admission to JNV Minicoy at class VI level is made through nationwide selection test conducted by Navodaya Vidyalaya Smiti. The information about test is disseminated and advertised in district by the office of Lakshadweep district magistrate (Collector), who is also the chairperson of Vidyalya Management Committee of JNV Minicoy.

Affiliations 
JNV Lakshadweep is affiliated to Central Board of Secondary Education with affiliation number 3240001.

See also 

 List of JNV schools

References

External links 

 Official Website of JNV Lakshadweep

Lakshadweep
Educational institutions established in 1988
1988 establishments in Lakshadweep
Minicoy
Education in Lakshadweep